{{Infobox martial artist
| name            = Bas Rutten

| other_names     =El Guapo ("The Handsome One")
| image           =Bas Rutten.jpg
| alt             =
| caption         =Rutten in 2009
| birth_name      =Sebastiaan Rutten
| birth_date      =
| birth_place     =Tilburg, Netherlands
| children        =3
| spouse          =Karin
| residence       =Westlake Village, California, US
| height          =
| weight_lb       =205
| weight_class    =
| reach_in        =
| style           = Kyokushin Karate, Muay Thai, Boxing, Taekwondo, Catch Wrestling, Sambo, Brazilian Jiu-Jitsu
| stance          = Square
| fighting_out_of = Los Angeles, California, US
| team            =
| trainer         =
Mekki Benazzouz
| rank            =  5th Dan Black Belt in Kyokushin Karate 2nd Dan Black Belt in Taekwondo
| years_active    =1993–1999, 2006 (MMA)
| kickbox_win     =14
| kickbox_kowin   =14
| kickbox_loss    =2
| mma_kowin       =11
| mma_subwin      =14 
| mma_decwin      =3

| mma_subloss     = 3
| mma_decloss     = 1

| mma_draw        =1
| url             =
| sherdog         =214
| footnotes       =
| updated         =
}}

Sebastiaan "Bas" Rutten (born 24 February 1965) is a Dutch-American actor, former mixed martial artist, kickboxer and professional wrestler. He was a UFC Heavyweight Champion, a three-time King of Pancrase world champion, and finished his career on a 22 fight unbeaten streak (21 wins, 1 draw). From 2007 to 2016, Rutten was the co-host of Inside MMA on AXS TV. Rutten became a naturalized American citizen receiving citizenship in the late 1990s.

As a professional fighter, one of his favorite tactics was the liver shot (both punch and kick), and he popularized its use in MMA.Barry, Steve. (5 January 2009) The Origin of Bas Rutten's Love of the Liver Shot?. Mmaconvert.com. Retrieved on 26 January 2016. Rutten is known for his charisma and has capitalized on his celebrity status since retiring from fighting in 1999. He has worked as a color commentator in several MMA organizations, including Pride, and has appeared in numerous television shows, movies, and video games. He also coaches MMA and has authored several instructional materials. In 2008, Rutten was ranked by Inside MMA as the fourth-greatest mixed martial arts fighter of all time.

Early life
Rutten was born in Tilburg, Netherlands. At the age of six, he developed eczema and severe asthma. His eczema meant he always wore long sleeves, turtle necks and gloves, and his asthma meant he was unable to partake in exercise, and was consequently relatively skinny. He was bullied on a daily basis as a child.

Bas started training in boxing in the backyard of an elementary school with a friend. Rutten became interested in martial arts at age 12 after his family went on vacation to France, where the movie Enter the Dragon starring Bruce Lee was playing at a local movie theatre. Bas could not get in because the movie was rated 17+, so he and his brother Sjoerd snuck into the theatre. After he saw the movie, he took an interest in martial arts. At first, his conservative parents did not allow him to pursue his interest but at age 14, after two years of begging his parents, they allowed him to practice taekwondo. He picked it up very quickly and after a few months he got in a street fight with the biggest bully in town. Rutten, now more confident, took the challenge and broke the bully's nose and KO'd him with the first punch he threw. The police came to his parents' house and Rutten was immediately prohibited by his parents from further practicing martial arts.

At age 21, he moved out of his parents' house and once again started training taekwondo. He was committed, eventually earning a 2nd degree black belt. He then began learning Kyokushin karate and earned a 2nd-degree black belt.

Kickboxing career
Bas Rutten started competing in kickboxing at the age of 20 while working also as a bouncer and model. He fought 16 times, winning the first 14 matches by knockout, 13 in the first round, and losing his final two fights. One of them would be against Frank Lobman for the European Muay Thai title on 12 February 1991, with Rutten losing by KO in the first round. According to Rutten, he signed up for the match while under the influence and without any kind of earlier preparation, but he decided not to pull out. Another of his most famous fights was against Rene Rooze, who bit Rutten's ear during the match. In response, Bas landed a knee to the groin, which interrupted the match and caused a brawl.

Mixed martial arts career
Early career
Rutten began his professional mixed martial arts career when he was working as an entertainer. He was scouted by Chris Dolman and invited to train at the Fighting Network RINGS Holland dojo. Though his first training was a difficult start for him, he focused on learning the rudiments of the art. In 1993, when Japanese pro wrestlers Masakatsu Funaki and Minoru Suzuki traveled to the Netherlands to scout fighters for their new "hybrid wrestling" organization, Pancrase, Rutten was immediately chosen. A precursor to modern mixed martial arts, the organization was the first of its kind and featured fighting with no closed fisted strikes to the face, and boasted early MMA names Frank Shamrock, Vernon White, Maurice Smith, Ken Shamrock, and Guy Mezger.

Pancrase

1993
In September 1993, Rutten had his debut in Pancrase against the 45lb heavier Ryushi Yanagisawa, knocking him out with palms and knee strikes in only 48 seconds. The KO was so brutal that Yanagisawa was carried from the ring and spent two days in hospital, with Bas himself fearing for his life. Rutten's second match, however, would be against a more experienced opponent, Takaku Fuke, and it would expose his main weakness, which was his lack of groundfighting experience. Fuke took Rutten down and locked an armbar, which forced the Dutch fighter to spend a rope escape, though Bas was eventually able to land a knee strike to the liver to finish the match with a win.

1994
His third match would be his first loss in Pancrase, as he faced a superior opponent in the form of Pancrase founder Masakatsu Funaki. Rutten was taken down and forced to close guard, a moment in which he accidentally hit Funaki with a closed-fisted punch. When he tried to apologize, the Japanese fighter capitalized and executed a toehold, making Rutten tap out. At that point of his career, Rutten realized the importance of the grappling aspect, and he started taping Pancrase trainings in order to practice those moves with his trainee Leon Van Dijk.

The training paid off, as Rutten submitted Japanese wrestler Kazuo "Yoshiki" Takahashi with an inverted heel hook during a grappling exchange that had been overconfidently initiated by Kazuo. The hold completely broke Takahashi's shin bone and gained Rutten an honorary 5th-degree black belt in Kyokushin Budokai by Jon Bluming after he learned the fact. Rutten then got his first high-level win against the other co-founder of Pancrase, the previously undefeated Minoru Suzuki. The Dutch fighter knocked him down with a body kick, resisted successfully all his submissions attempts on the ground and then hit a knee to the liver on a downed Suzuki, finishing him off. Rutten later said that this win was one of the happiest moments of his life.

Just 20 days later, Rutten faced another steep test, fighting future UFC Hall of Famer Ken Shamrock, who was then one of the best Pancrase fighters. This time the Dutch had Masakatsu Funaki himself in his corner, as he had got the Japanese to formally teach him shoot wrestling. Rutten turned in a hard effort, being taken down by Shamrock and held under dominant position for most of the match. The more experienced Shamrock made Rutten spend rope escapes by submitting him with a pair of heel hooks and a rear naked choke, and although Rutten still tried on, he was ultimately choked out. After this, Rutten decided to omit strikes from his training and focus only on grappling, and he bounced back from the loss with a submission win over Brazilian jiu-jitsu black belt Jason DeLucia, trading submission attempts with him before ending the match with a guillotine choke.

In December 1994, Rutten then participated in one of the greatest events in mixed martial arts history to the point, the King of Pancrase Tournament. The winner of this tournament would be crowned the first champion of Pancrase. Rutten was one of the four #1 seeds in the tournament, and his first fight was against MMA newcomer and future UFC champion Frank Shamrock. The fight was a controversial one, as Rutten locked an earlier rear naked choke under the ropes, only to have the referee to break it up without deducting a lost point from Frank. After that point, the two nullified each other until the end of the match, which saw an upset decision win for Shamrock. Frank also left the match with a broken nose by a high kick.

1995
Rutten found a measure of redemption after the upset loss by choking out expert grappler and King of Pancrase Tournament Finalist Manabu Yamada in his next fight, on 26 January 1995. Rutten was taken to the ground, but he clamped an arm triangle choke from half guard and exerted such a pressure that Yamada, refusing to tap out, was choked out and remained unconscious with his eyes wide open after the hold. Thanks to this performance against the tournament finalist, Rutten received a rematch and a title shot against tournament winner and then-current King of Pancrase Ken Shamrock for the King of Pancrase title on 10 March. The match was very anticipated, but it ended early when Shamrock executed a kneebar and forced Rutten to submit. According to the Dutch, the loss was due to his training partner Funaki teaching him the wrong way to escape a kneebar, which made Rutten spin in the opposite direction giving a tighter hold for Shamrock. After this failure, Rutten focused on grappling even harder and started training 2 to 3 times a day solely on submissions.

Again, Rutten's new training paid off, and he stole a win from Takaku Fuke with an armbar from the guard and a finishing heel hook. He then faced another dangerous striker, American kickboxing champion Maurice Smith, who in turn fell down to the mat to avoid Bas's striking. Rutten grappled with him and showed his technical brilliance, firstly submitting Smith with a heel hook performed with his own chin and later executing a figure-four toehold for the win. After dispatching next Jason DeLucia by submission as well, Rutten got a rematch with Frank Shamrock on 23 July. Their fight was similar to the first bout, with both men trading positions and holds, and again the referee controversially broke up two kneebars which were performed by Rutten next to the ropes, but this time Rutten would win the split decision.

The win granted him a challenge title match in September 1995 against the King of Pancrase Minoru Suzuki, which was their rematch from the fight at the beginning of their careers. The match was long and intense, as Suzuki rode Rutten for most of their exchanges in the bout, and actually managed to force him to spend a rope escape with a tight kneebar. Rutten held his own through his defensive acumen, occasionally countering with guillotine chokes and a surprising rolling kneebar from standing, until the match came to its last minutes. After getting from under a mount, Rutten threw a front kick to the body which downed Suzuki and followed with a guillotine choke, making the King of Pancrase tap out.

After putting his title defenses on hold due to an injury, Rutten returned to the ring in a rematch against Maurice Smith. Overwhelmed by Rutten's strikes, Smith opted for taking him down every time possible, but Rutten ended up performing a half guard sweep into a rear naked choke for the tap out. His next time would be against the man he debuted against in Pancrase, Ryushi Yanagisawa, and this time the match lasted 27:35. Despite breaking his hand during the match, Rutten scored three consecutive submissions through the affair before ending it with another rear naked choke.

1996
In March 1996, Rutten faced Lion's Den fighter and future Ultimate Fighting Championship winner Guy Mezger. Through the fight, Rutten dominated the stand-up with liver shots and palm strikes, forcing Mezger to take him down and meet him on the ground. There Mezger was able to control Rutten, but was unable to score a submission, while the Dutch defended and capitalized on the stand-up segments to inflict damage. At the end, after a leglock exchange, Rutten locked a heel hook variation to submit Mezger.

On 16 May 1996 Rutten defended his title before Frank Shamrock in their third match, which was also for Shamrock's interim King of Pancrase title. Controlling the takedowns as usual, Shamrock gained north-south position several times, but was unable to submit Rutten, and Rutten in turn knocked him down with an open-handed uppercut. The two fighters struggled, and even fell off the ring in a failed takedown. In midst of the fight, Frank famously taunted Rutten by sticking out his tongue at him during a leglock exchange, which moved Bas to hit him in the face with a close-fisted punch, losing a point by red card as Shamrock expected. At the end, however, Rutten won the fight by TKO due to an eye cut, unifying the King of Pancrase belts.

Right after his match against Shamrock, Rutten had his rubber match against Jason DeLucia. The fight was controversial for DeLucia repeatedly claiming Rutten had hit him with a closed fist, which cost the Dutch fighter a yellow card and later a red card. In response, Rutten hit several shots to DeLucia's liver, rupturing it and knocking him out painfully.

At Pancrase 1996 Anniversary Show, taking place on 7 September, Rutten defended his undisputed title against Masakatsu Funaki in what is considered to be one of the greatest fights in Pancrase history. The Japanese wrestler came near finishing the match earlier with an ankle lock, but Rutten escaped miraculously and proceeded to fend Funaki off for the rest of the bout, utilizing the same stalling strategy he had used against Suzuki. Funaki made a wide usage of the knee-on-stomach and mount position to initiate leglock attacks, but the Dutch countered every time and eventually pushed Masakatsu away, a moment in which the Japanese threw an illegal kick to Rutten while he was getting up. In response, the Dutch fighter knocked Funaki down with a palm strike, and then completely broke his nose with a second palm strike to a supine Masakatsu. The stunned Japanese tried to trade hits with Rutten, only for Bas to capitalize on this with his famed striking game. Rutten knocked him down twice with palms and knees, and he followed landing a lengthy, unanswered string of strikes until a knee to the face finally downed Funaki for the KO victory. In doing so, he became a three-time King of Pancrase.

Rutten described the war with Funaki in an interview:

His next fight was an anticipated rematch with Manabu Yamada, which lasted only 0:54 before Rutten made him to tap out to a leg-entangled toehold. Following the match, he relinquished his title to be present for the birth of his second daughter.

1997
On 22 March 1997 Rutten returned to Pancrase in a match against Osami Shibuya, a bout in which he was unexpectedly forced to fight for the draw after his own sternum broke through the struggle. The Dutchman avenged the accident in a rematch with Shibuya, in which he submitted the Japanese with a spinal lock from ura-gatame position he nicknamed "Bas Rutten Neck Crank."

Rutten returned to Pancrase, taking 8 more victories, bringing his unbeaten streak up to 19 straight fights.

Rutten left Pancrase as one of the most dominant fighters in the history of the organization. MMA legend Ken Shamrock was the only fighter Rutten did not avenge a loss to. In 2000, when Rutten was PRIDE FC's color commentator, a third fight with Shamrock was entertained. Rutten agreed to come out of retirement to fight Shamrock in PRIDE FC. However, Shamrock stated that he already beat Rutten twice and that a third time wasn't necessary. Later, in 2002, Rutten said that he would not fight Shamrock again even if it was offered to him because of the friendship they developed over the years, and that he could not put his mind and heart into fighting Ken.

Ultimate Fighting Championship
UFC Heavyweight Champion
Rutten was originally told about Ultimate Fighting Championship (UFC) before its first event in 1993, when would-be UFC competitor Ken Shamrock proposed it to him, but Rutten decided to stay in Pancrase, as he felt the "no rules" format was too dangerous and he did not want to risk his career so early. However, he signed with the UFC in 1998, after his Pancrase career. Rutten entered the UFC with a massive amount of hype; he was undefeated in his last 19 fights and was touted by the organization as the "world's greatest martial artist."

Rutten was originally scheduled to fight heavyweight champion Randy Couture in a title match for the UFC Heavyweight Championship in his first fight, but Couture had a contract dispute and left the UFC to sign with a different promotion. The title was then stripped from Couture and a tournament of sorts was set up to determine the next champion. Thus, the Dutchman's first fight in his quest for the UFC belt was against Fighting Network RINGS exponent Tsuyoshi Kosaka at UFC 18. During the bout, Rutten was repeatedly taken down and struck with ground and pound, but he ended up scoring a dramatic KO with just a minute left in overtime. The fight was a source of controversy because referee John McCarthy seemed to unfairly stand the fight up when Kosaka was mounted on Rutten and actively landing clean effective punches.

On 7 May 1999, at UFC 20, Rutten faced Kevin Randleman for the UFC Heavyweight Championship. The first four minutes consisted of Rutten taking unanswered punishment from his guard, getting blood on his face, but after the fight was stood up to check Rutten's cut, Rutten landed a hard kick to Randleman's liver, slowing his pace for the rest of the fight. They then exchanged strikes in Bas's guard, with the Dutch fighter opening a cut in Randleman via elbow strikes on top of his head, until the end of the overtime. The fight went to the judges, and they gave the split decision win to Rutten, crowning him as UFC Heavyweight Champion. This victory met a heated controversy from fans and professionals of the sport alike, among them Randleman's corner and Mark Coleman, who criticized the judges' decision. Fight judging at that point was not based on the current 10-point must system, but on whom the judges felt won the fight overall.

Rutten vacated the title later in the year, in order to drop down to middleweight (now known as light heavyweight) a weight closer to his natural weight, in a bid to try to become the first person to hold a UFC title in two weight classes. However, he would end up never continuing his career, as while training for his next UFC fight in 1999 he suffered multiple serious injuries, including blowing out his knee (a long-running injury), tearing his biceps, and suffering a neck injury. He was forced to retire from MMA competition for the time being, by doctor's orders.

He was proposed a fight against Kazushi Sakuraba when he was contacted by Pride Fighting Championships, but Rutten declined due to an insufficient fight purse, preferring to sign up as a fight commentator. He was replaced by Wanderlei Silva in the card.

UFC Hall of Fame
On 22 May 2015 UFC President Dana White appeared on Inside MMA to announce that Rutten would be inducted into the UFC Hall of Fame during International Fight Week in July. Rutten is the first European to be inducted, taking his place in the "Pioneers" wing of the UFC's new-look Hall of Fame.Dana White Surprises Bas Rutten w/ UFC Hall of Fame Invitation. YouTube (22 May 2015). Retrieved on 26 January 2016.

Former UFC Light Heavyweight Champion Tito Ortiz has credited Rutten for inspiration during his early days. Ortiz said; "I looked up to Bas Rutten. Bas was my idol. People were just so scared of fighting him, he was like the man. I thought that was what I need to do now. If I train as hard as he does then one day I'll be as good as him and two years later look where I am, I'm on top of the world. I've got to say thanks to him, (Bas) for helping me out by making me believe in dreams."

Last fight
In May 2006, Rutten announced his return to MMA competition. Cleared by doctors to fight again, Rutten was slated to face Kimo Leopoldo in the now-defunct World Fighting Alliance on 22 July 2006, at The Forum in Los Angeles. Two days before the event, Kimo tested positive for Stanozolol, an anabolic steroid. In place of Kimo, Rutten fought Ruben "Warpath" Villareal. Rutten took a first-round victory by way of technical knockout after low kicks left his opponent unable to stand. With that he brought up his professional record to 28 wins 4 losses and 1 draw. After the fight, Rutten tested positive for hydrocodone, morphine, and diphenhydramine.

Professional wrestling career
Rutten competed in Japanese professional wrestling following his Pancrase tenure. He made his debut at the Inoki Bom-Ba-Ye 2000 event, where he teamed up with Alexander Otsuka to defeat the team of Naoki Sano and Ricco Rodríguez, with Rutten personally submitting Sano with a crossface chickenwing. He also wrestled in Battlarts, defeating Carl Malenko by KO via palm strike.

In 2002, Rutten debuted in New Japan Pro-Wrestling as a part of Antonio Inoki's MMA army. Before his first match, he was featured in vignettes learning the shining wizard from watching Keiji Mutoh tapes in order to adapt to NJPW professional wrestling. He mostly wrestled in singles matches, beating both rookies and veterans like Manabu Nakanishi, Hiroshi Tanahashi and Masayuki Naruse. In July, he challenged for the IWGP Heavyweight Championship against Yuji Nagata, but he was defeated. After three months, in October, he was featured in a special European Catch Wrestling Rules Match against Osamu Nishimura with Tony St. Clair as a special referee. The match went to a time limit draw after ten rounds, despite Nishimura's illegal blows. The same month, Rutten dropped down to the junior heavyweight division and received another title match, this time against Koji Kanemoto for the IWGP Junior Heavyweight Championship, but he was unsuccessful.

Post-fight career
After his retirement from fighting in 1999, Rutten focused on becoming an actor, getting small parts on TV shows such as  Martial Law, 18 Wheels of Justice, The King of Queens, "Lights Out" and the Canadian series Freedom, as well as appearing in low budget movies such as Shadow Fury, The Eliminator, and the comedy short The Kingdom of Ultimate Power which was featured in the 2005 L.A. Film Festival. It also won the first prize at the short film festival in NY for "best comedy".

Rutten was also the color commentator for the English productions of Pride Fighting Championships events, calling nearly every event from Pride 1 through the 2005 Grand Prix.  Known for his sense of humor and first-hand knowledge of the sport, Rutten quickly became a fan favorite commentator. In April 2006 he announced that he would not continue to announce for Pride, due to the constant flying to Japan, and being away from his family every month.

Rutten has a cameo in the video game Grand Theft Auto IV on the in-game TV show called "The Men's Room." He also did motion capture for the main character's fighting moves. He said that when he arrived at the motion-capture place in New York he asked the people in charge how violent they wanted to have it and they told him to "give it all he got". After two hours they stopped him and said, "It's OK, you don't have to go any further".

He was also featured in WCW vs. the World for the PlayStation, but was named "Thunder Dome" to avoid copyright laws.

On 23 January 2008, he was announced as the new Vice President, Fighter Operations reporting directly to IFL CEO Jay Larkin. His role was to build relations between the IFL and its fighters as well as work on potential match-ups between fighters. He also hosted the weekly shows "Battleground" and "International Fight League" with Kenny Rice. This all ended when IFL went out of business in late 2008.

In 2009, he appeared in the music video for Listen to Your Friends by the rock band New Found Glory, "fighting" lead vocalist Jordan Pundik.
Bas and Rice hosted Inside MMA, a weekly MMA variety show on AXS TV. The pair also did remote English commentary and play-by-play for Dream events broadcast in North America on HDNet. The pair were eventually replaced by Guy Mezger and Michael Schiavello, who attend the events live in Japan. He is currently appearing in public health service ads, airing on Cartoon Network. He also made a public service announcement against trying out MMA at home but CagePotato ridiculed it for its mixed messages.

Rutten was featured in the 2012 American sports comedy movie Here Comes the Boom alongside Kevin James and Henry Winkler. Rutten played the role of a former MMA fighter and Dutch immigrant Niko trying to gain US citizenship. In return for his help in gaining citizenship, Niko helps train 42-year-old biology teacher Scott (Kevin James) to become a MMA fighter in the UFC. The film also features former UFC fighter Krzysztof Soszynski, former Muay Thai kickboxer Mark DellaGrotte along with cameo roles for Bruce Buffer, Chael Sonnen, Jason Miller, Satoshi Ishii, Mark Muñoz, Herb Dean, Wanderlei Silva, and Joe Rogan amongst others.

On 23 October 2013, the World Series of Fighting announced Rutten as a member of the broadcast team for WSOF events on NBCSN along with Todd Harris.

Rutten currently works as a commentator for Karate Combat.

Coaching
Rutten is certified as an instructor of both MTBN Thai Boxing and mixed martial arts, as well as krav maga.

Rutten coached Mark Kerr during the filming of the HBO documentary The Smashing Machine.

In 2006, Rutten was a team coach for the International Fight League, an MMA organization that focused on team combat. His team, the Anacondas, defeated the Silverbacks 3–2. He is also a former investor in the Legends MMA gym in Hollywood and used to teach there occasionally, and is now a part owner of the MMA gym Bas Rutten's Elite Mixed Martial Arts in Thousand Oaks, California. He teaches a MMA class on Tuesdays.

He has also trained former street fighter Kimbo Slice for his professional MMA bouts, as well as professional wrestler Samoa Joe.

Fighting style
Rutten's main reason for success in Pancrase was his well-rounded fighting style, excelling both in striking and grappling. His stand-up offensive, learned from the Dutch school of Muay Thai, Karate and Taekwondo was aggressive yet deceptively technical. According to Frank Shamrock, it often intimidated other fighters. He would say, "His kickboxing was devastating. It was something everybody feared. The other thing he had was a basic understanding of real fighting ... Bas had that street fighter mentality." One of his favored tactics was unbalancing his opponents with push kicks against the ring ropes before overwhelming them with palm strikes and body punches, nullifying their ability to counterattack or defend. Rutten never developed an effective takedown defense, but he was apt at landing strikes while being taken down, having knocked out opponents before they could complete the technique. The most famous aspect of his striking, however, was his skill to target the opponent's liver, using punches, knees and kicks to damage it and incapacitate his adversary.

Rutten's groundwork was built through a slow evolution and was unusual for being mostly self-taught. Initially counting only on defense rudiments learned from Chris Dolman, he developed his game by copying Pancrase trainings and became a dangerous submission fighter. His grappling style was patterned after Pancrase's native shoot wrestling (better known as "Catch wrestling" in the west), and he focused on chokeholds, leglocks, and a solid submission defense, which helped him to avoid being forced to submit by even high-level offensive grapplers like Masakatsu Funaki and Minoru Suzuki.

Personal life
Rutten currently lives in Westlake Village, California, with his wife Karin and two daughters – Sabine and Bianca. Rutten also has a daughter from his first wife; her name is Rachele. He became a citizen of the United States twenty years ago. By the end of 2015, he received his first grandchild, a grandson from Rachele, who currently lives in Belgium.

Back in the Netherlands, Rutten is friends with former UFC competitor Gerard Gordeau.

Rutten is known by the moniker "El Guapo", which means "The Handsome One" in Spanish.

He became known for the victory celebration known as "Rutten Jump", in which he would do a jumping split after winning a fight. Rutten talked about the origins of the Rutten Jump on his website: "When I won my first fight in Pancrase, I was so hyped that I jumped up in the splits to each side of the ring. Why? I don't know. But, it became my trademark and I had to do it after every fight that I won."

In 2010, Rutten partnered with clothing brand, Tokyo Five, to produce and star in a cooking show titled Grandma's Kitchen with Bas Rutten. The show's pilot was scheduled to air 26 February 2010; however, due to a physical altercation between Rutten and co-hosts, production has been delayed indefinitely.

Religion
Rutten is a practicing Catholic, talking about his faith in God on YouTube. Raised in a Catholic family, Rutten stopped practicing the faith at around 12 years old when his parents stopped attending church, but he returned to the faith in 2013. He has credited his friend Kevin James, and others, with helping him in his journey back to Catholicism. Rutten has spoken out against anti-Catholic discrimination in Hollywood.

Tattoos
Rutten has several tattoos, each of which is intended to help him spiritually and emotionally.

Street fights
Bas Rutten is known for his brawls and bar fights around the world. In particular, he once threw Paul Varelans through a glass window in Russia via kimura lock when Varelans tried to bite his back, and immediately after he disarmed and assaulted an armed bouncer. He also participated in a brawl that took place at a bar in Sweden in which he fought several bouncers at the same time. This fight is particularly notorious as it landed Rutten in a Swedish jail.

Championships and accomplishments

Mixed martial arts
Ultimate Fighting Championship
UFC Hall of Fame (Pioneer wing, 2015 inductee)
UFC Heavyweight Championship (One time)
First Dutch champion in UFC history
Undefeated in the UFC (2–0)
Pancrase
King of Pancrase Openweight Championship (Three times)
Unified the King of Pancrase Championship
Two successful title defenses
Sherdog
Mixed Martial Arts Hall of Fame (2014 inductee)
Fight Matrix
1996 Fighter of the Year

Mixed martial arts record

|-
| Win
| align=center| 
| Ruben Villareal
| TKO (leg kicks)
| WFA: King of the Streets
| 
| align=center| 1
| align=center| 3:24
| Los Angeles, California, United States
| 
|-
| Win
| align=center| 27–4–1
| Kevin Randleman
| Decision (split)
| UFC 20
| 
| align=center| 1
| align=center| 21:00
| Birmingham, Alabama, United States
| 
|-
| Win
| align=center| 26–4–1
| Tsuyoshi Kohsaka
| TKO (punches)
| UFC 18
| 
| align=center| 1
| align=center| 14:15
| Kenner, Louisiana, United States
| 
|-
| Win
| align=center| 25–4–1
| Kengo Watanabe
| TKO (palm strikes)
| Pancrase: 1998 Anniversary Show
| 
| align=center| 1
| align=center| 2:58
| Tokyo, Japan
| 
|-
| Win
| align=center| 24–4–1
| Keiichiro Yamamiya
| Submission (rear-naked choke)
| Pancrase: Alive 11
| 
| align=center| 1
| align=center| 4:58
| Yokohama, Kanagawa, Japan
| 
|-
| Win
| align=center| 23–4–1
| Osami Shibuya
| Submission (body crunch)
| Pancrase: 1997 Anniversary Show
| 
| align=center| 1
| align=center| 3:15
| Urayasu, Chiba, Japan
| 
|-
| Win
| align=center| 22–4–1
| Takaku Fuke
| Submission (armbar)
| Pancrase: Alive 7
| 
| align=center| 1
| align=center| 4:28
| Hakata, Fukuoka, Japan
| 
|-
| Win
| align=center| 21–4–1
| Kiuma Kunioku
| Decision (points)
| Pancrase: Alive 4
| 
| align=center| 1
| align=center| 15:00
| Urayasu, Chiba, Japan
| 
|-
| Draw
| align=center| 20–4–1
| Osami Shibuya
| Draw (majority)
| Pancrase: Alive 3
| 
| align=center| 1
| align=center| 15:00
| Nagoya, Aichi, Japan
| 
|-
| Win
| align=center| 20–4
| Manabu Yamada
| Submission (ankle lock)
| Pancrase: Truth 7
| 
| align=center| 1
| align=center| 0:54
| Nagoya, Aichi, Japan
| 
|-
| Win
| align=center| 19–4
| Masakatsu Funaki
| KO (knee)
| Pancrase: 1996 Anniversary Show
| 
| align=center| 1
| align=center| 17:05
| Urayasu, Chiba, Japan
| 
|-
| Win
| align=center| 18–4
| Jason DeLucia
| KO (kick to the body)
| Pancrase: Truth 6
| 
| align=center| 1
| align=center| 8:48
| Fukuoka, Fukuoka, Japan
| 
|-
| Win
| align=center| 17–4
| Frank Shamrock
| TKO (doctor stoppage)
| Pancrase: Truth 5
| 
| align=center| 1
| align=center| 11:11
| Tokyo, Japan
| 
|-
| Win
| align=center| 16–4
| Katsuomi Inagaki
| TKO (points)
| Pancrase: Truth 4
| 
| align=center| 1
| align=center| 14:07
| Tokyo, Japan
| 
|-
| Win
| align=center| 15–4
| Guy Mezger
| Submission (ankle lock)
| Pancrase: Truth 2
| 
| align=center| 1
| align=center| 19:36
| Kobe, Hyogo, Japan
| 
|-
| Win
| align=center| 14–4
| Ryushi Yanagisawa
| Submission (rear-naked choke)
| Pancrase: Eyes of Beast 7
| 
| align=center| 1
| align=center| 27:35
| Sapporo, Hokkaido, Japan
| 
|-
| Win
| align=center| 13–4
| Maurice Smith
| Submission (rear-naked choke)
| Pancrase: Eyes of Beast 6
| 
| align=center| 1
| align=center| 4:34
| Yokohama, Kanagawa, Japan
| 
|-
| Win
| align=center| 12–4
| Minoru Suzuki
| Submission (guillotine choke)
| Pancrase: 1995 Anniversary Show
| 
| align=center| 1
| align=center| 15:35
| Tokyo, Japan
| 
|-
| Win
| align=center| 11–4
| Frank Shamrock
| Decision (split)
| Pancrase: 1995 Neo-Blood Tournament Second Round
| 
| align=center| 1
| align=center| 15:00
| Tokyo, Japan
| 
|-
| Win
| align=center| 10–4
| Jason DeLucia
| Submission (heel hook)
| Pancrase: Eyes of Beast 5
| 
| align=center| 1
| align=center| 1:32
| Sapporo, Hokkaido, Japan
| 
|-
| Win
| align=center| 9–4
| Maurice Smith
| Submission (kneebar)
| Pancrase: Eyes of Beast 4
| 
| align=center| 1
| align=center| 2:10
| Urayasu, Chiba, Japan
| 
|-
| Win
| align=center| 8–4
| Takaku Fuke
| Submission (heel hook)
| Pancrase: Eyes of Beast 3
| 
| align=center| 1
| align=center| 1:52
| Nagoya, Aichi, Japan
| 
|-
| Loss
| align=center| 7–4
| Ken Shamrock
| Submission (kneebar)
| Pancrase: Eyes of Beast 2
| 
| align=center| 1
| align=center| 1:01
| Yokohama, Kanagawa, Japan
| 
|-
| Win
| align=center| 7–3
| Manabu Yamada
| Technical Submission (arm-triangle choke)
| Pancrase: Eyes of Beast 1
| 
| align=center| 1
| align=center| 1:05
| Nagoya, Aichi, Japan
| 
|-
| Loss
| align=center| 6–3
| Frank Shamrock
| Decision (majority)
| Pancrase: King of Pancrase Tournament Opening Round
| 
| align=center| 1
| align=center| 10:00
| Tokyo, Japan
| 
|-
| Win
| align=center| 6–2
| Jason DeLucia
| Submission (guillotine choke)
| Pancrase: Road to the Championship 5
| 
| align=center| 1
| align=center| 1:43
| Tokyo, Japan
| 
|-
| Loss
| align=center| 5–2
| Ken Shamrock
| Submission (rear-naked choke)
| Pancrase: Road to the Championship 3
| 
| align=center| 1
| align=center| 16:42
| Tokyo, Japan
| 
|-
| Win
| align=center| 5–1
| Minoru Suzuki
| KO (knee to the body)
| Pancrase: Road to the Championship 2
| 
| align=center| 1
| align=center| 3:43
| Amagasaki, Hyogo, Japan
| 
|-
| Win
| align=center| 4–1
| Kazuo Takahashi
| TKO (knee injury)
| Pancrase: Road to the Championship 1
| 
| align=center| 1
| align=center| 1:37
| Tokyo, Japan
| 
|-
| Win
| align=center| 3–1
| Vernon White
| Submission (guillotine choke)
| Pancrase: Pancrash! 3
| 
| align=center| 1
| align=center| 1:16
| Osaka, Osaka, Japan
| 
|-
| Loss
| align=center| 2–1
| Masakatsu Funaki
| Submission (toe hold)
| Pancrase: Pancrash! 1
| 
| align=center| 1
| align=center| 2:58
| Yokohama, Kanagawa, Japan
| 
|-
| Win
| align=center| 2–0
| Takaku Fuke
| KO (knee to the body)
| Pancrase: Yes, We Are Hybrid Wrestlers 2
| 
| align=center| 1
| align=center| 2:03
| Nagoya, Aichi, Japan
| 
|-
| Win
| align=center| 1–0
| Ryushi Yanagisawa
| KO (palm strike)
| Pancrase: Yes, We Are Hybrid Wrestlers 1
| 
| align=center| 1
| align=center| 0:43
| Urayasu, Chiba, Japan
| 

Filmography

Works
 Bas Rutten's Big Book of Combat, Volumes One and Two (2002)
 Bas Rutten's Big DVDs of Combat Bas Rutten's Lethal Street Fighting (2003)
 Bas Rutten's MMA Workout (2001)
 Bas Rutten's Superior Free Fight Techniques Bas Rutten's "Extreme Pancrase" No-Holds Barred Fighting System Training with Bas Rutten "Never Back Down Special Features" 2008 TERA Online"MMO-FO.com Spokesman" 2012''

References

External links

 
 
 
 

1965 births
Living people
Dutch emigrants to the United States
Dutch male kickboxers
Dutch male mixed martial artists
Dutch male karateka
Dutch male professional wrestlers
Dutch Muay Thai practitioners
Dutch male taekwondo practitioners
Dutch Roman Catholics
Mixed martial artists utilizing kickboxing
Mixed martial artists utilizing Krav Maga
Mixed martial artists utilizing Muay Thai
Light heavyweight mixed martial artists
Heavyweight mixed martial artists
Mixed martial artists utilizing Kyokushin kaikan
Mixed martial artists utilizing taekwondo
Mixed martial arts broadcasters
Ultimate Fighting Championship champions
Pride Fighting Championships
Sportspeople from Tilburg
People from Westlake Village, California
Ultimate Fighting Championship male fighters